Edward J. Schulte (April 27, 1890 – June 7, 1975) was an architect who designed a number of mid-twentieth-century churches notable for their blending of a modern idiom with traditional function. Inspired by an encounter with Ralph Adams Cram, he devoted himself to building church buildings, designing over 88. He served as president of the Cincinnati chapter of the American Institute of Architects.

Schulte had a sole practice after 1912, then practiced with Robert E. Crowe from 1921–1923, and practiced alone after that to 1967.

Early life and education
Edward Schulte displayed a talent for drawing early on and was encouraged to pursue it by the nuns in the parochial school he attended as a child.  His father, a building contractor, wanted him to take up architecture instead, suggesting him to the firm of Werner and Adkins, who had designed a Carnegie library for Norwood. (Schulte’s father was one of three trustees to build it.) Schulte began working for Werner and Adkins during the day while attending classes at the Art Academy at night, eventually becoming a valued member of the firm with a special skill for watercolor renderings of proposed projects for client presentations.  Before long, however, Werner and Adkins began to suffer from financial problems, temporarily loaning Schulte out to another firm before bringing him back upon securing a new partner – H.E. Kennedy – and several new commissions, among them an office building for New Orleans.

Early career
Kennedy was awarded the commission to design the Harris Theater in downtown Pittsburgh and had Schulte design it – a task that required him to spend long nights in the library researching precedents for the relatively new building typology.  Among the draftsmen for the project was Robert E. Crowe, who would later become Schulte's partner and most important collaborator.  Upon the success of the Harris Theatre project, Kennedy moved his office to Pittsburgh, bringing Schulte along with him.  It was during this time that Schulte attended a candlelit lecture by Ralph Adams Cram at the Hall of Architecture in the Carnegie Museum, inspiring him to focus on churches over the remainder of his career. Schulte is the only architect in history to design and build four cathedrals. His complete overhaul of the Cathedral-Basilica of St. Peter in Chains in Cincinnati (which effectively preserved only its corinthian portico and titanic spire) elevates this count to a staggering five.

List of buildings designed or overseen
This list of Schulte's work was compiled by Donald A. Tenoever:

ROBERT CROWE & EDWARD SCHULTE (1921–1934)
St. Catherine Church, Cincinnati, Ohio (1921)
St. Ann Convent Chapel, Melbourne, Kentucky (1921) 
Sisters of Notre Dame Convent, Covington, Kentucky (1922)
St. Theresa Home for the Aged, Cincinnati, Ohio (1923)
The Fontbonne, Cincinnati, Ohio (1924)
Fenwick Club Gymnasium, Cincinnati, Ohio (1925)
St. Meinrad Abbey, St. Meinrad, Indiana (1925)
Friars Club, Cincinnati, Ohio (1926)
St. Monica Church and Rectory, Cincinnati, Ohio (1926
Mt. St. Joseph College addition, Cincinnati, Ohio (1926)
Chapel of the Holy Spirit, Fenwick Club, Cincinnati, Ohio (1927)
Church of the Assumption remodeling, Cincinnati, Ohio (1927)
Regina High School, Cincinnati, Ohio (1927)
Purcell High School, Cincinnati, Ohio (1927)
St. Cecilia Church, Cincinnati, Ohio (1928)
St. Peter Church, Lexington, Kentucky (1928)
Crusade Castle remodeling, Cincinnati, Ohio (1928)
Loreto Guild, Dayton, Ohio (1928)
Paramount Building, Cincinnati, Ohio (1928)
Milford Noviate, Cincinnati, Ohio (1929)
Church of the Holy Ghost, Knoxville, Tennessee (1929)
Mercy Hospital, Knoxville, Tennessee (1932)
St. Agnes School and Auditorium, Cincinnati, Ohio (1933)

EDWARD SCHULTE (1934–1967)
William Schanzlé residence (1934)
Chapel of St. Victor, New Baltimore, Ohio
1935–1936
St. Bernard Church, Taylor Creek, Ohio
Immaculate Conception Convent, Ferdinand, Indiana
Dr. E.J. Gaenge residence, 
Zion Reformed Church, Norwood, Ohio
Francis H. Mitchell residence
Dr. Johnson McGuire residence
H.R. Drackett residence
High School, Lawrenceburg, Indiana
1936–1937
St. Peter Chapel and School, Hamilton, Ohio
Ruth Wolfgang residence
Sisters of Mercy Convent, Cincinnati, Ohio
St. Ann School addition, Hamilton, Ohio
St. John School addition, Deer Park, Cincinnati, Ohio
1938–1939
St. Monica School, Dallas, Texas
Julius Fleischman residence remodeling 
Immaculate Conception School, Dayton, Ohio
Mother of God Chapel, Walnut Hills, Cincinnati, Ohio
George Goodrich residence
St. Dymphna Chapel and Rectory, Cincinnati, Ohio
St. Bridgid Church alterations, Xenia, Ohio
J.M. Christi residence
Holy Angels School and Auditorium, Cincinnati, Ohio
St. Ursala School and Chapel, Cincinnati, Ohio
1939–1940
St. Teresa School addition and Auditorium, Cincinnati, Ohio
St. Christina School and Rectory, Lockland, Ohio
St. James School and Auditorium, Cincinnati, Ohio
St. Albert the Great Church, Dayton, Ohio
St. Dominic Rectory, Cincinnati, Ohio
St. Meinrad Abbey boiler house, St. Meinrad, Indiana
Holy Family Church redecoration, Dayton, Ohio
Fannie J. Randolph residence
St. Antonio de Padua Church, Cincinnati, Ohio
St. Thomas Church, Fort Thomas, Kentucky
Blessed Sacrament Church, Fort Mitchell, Kentucky
St. James of the Valley Church Wyoming, Ohio
Dorothea L. Hoffman residence
George C. Euskirchen residence
Elizabeth D. Harrison residence
Carl Zimmerman residence
Fred J. Runte residence
1941–1942
St. John School addition, Cincinnati, Ohio
Chapel for Mr. and Mrs. Charles M. Williams, Cincinnati, Ohio
Our Lady of Lourdes School, Indianapolis, Indiana
St. Paul Indian mission Church, Marty, South Dakota
Physics and Biology Building, Oberlin College, Oberlin, Ohio
Our Lady of Lourdes Church, Indianapolis, Indiana
Chapel in Archbishop's residence, Indianapolis, Indiana
Clara Koch residence
Resurrection of Our Lord School addition, Dayton, Ohio
St. Michael Church, Muskegon, Michigan
St. Mary Church, Bethel, Ohio
Mary J. Erhart residence
Saints Peter and Paul Church, Haubstadt, Indiana
St. Stephen Church and Rectory, Dayton, Ohio
1942–1943
Sacred Heart Convent Church, Benedictine Convent and Academy addition, Yankton, South Dakota
St. Dominic School addition, Cincinnati, Ohio
St. Clement Church remodeling, Reading, Ohio
St. Anthony Church, Effingham, Illinois
St. Anthony School addition, Cheviot, Ohio
Guardian Angel School, Auditorium and Rectory, Cincinnati, Ohio
St. Theresa Hall, St. Paul Indian Mission, Marty, South Dakota
1944–1945
St. Meinrad Abbey, seminary addition, St. Meinrad, Indiana
Sacred Heart Nurses Home, Yankton, South Dakota
Our Lady of Mercy Hospital addition, Mariemont, Ohio
St. Jude Convent and Rectory, Fort Wayne, Indiana
St. George Monastery, Cincinnati, Ohio
1945–1946
Our Lady of Mercy Hospital Sisters House, Cincinnati, Ohio
St. Margaret Mary School alterations and additions, Cincinnati, Ohio
St. Meinrad Parish School, St. Meinrad, Indiana
Blessed Sacrament Church, La Crosse, Wisconsin
St. Meinrad Science and Auditorium building, St. Meinrad, Indiana
Saints Peter and Paul School, Haubstadt, Indiana
St. Lawrence Church alterations and redecoration, Cincinnati, Ohio
Christ the King School and Auditorium, Dallas, Texas
St. Michael power house, St. Michael, North Dakota
St. Ann School, New Castle, Indiana
St. Mary Cathedral renovation, Covington, Kentucky
St. Thomas More School, Paducah, Kentucky

1947–1948
Sacred Heart Home, Men's Building, Yankton, South Dakota
St. Cecelia Church, Dallas, Texas
Immaculate Conception School and Convent, Aurora, Indiana
Elder High School Stadium, Cincinnati, Ohio
St. Lawrence Rectory remodeling, Cincinnati, Ohio
Glenmary Seminary, Glendale, Ohio
Immaculate Heart of Mary Church, Rectory, School, Indianapolis, Indiana
St. Francis Hospital Chapel, Washington, Missouri
Holy Cross Seminary, La Crosse, Wisconsin
1949–1950
Bishop Marty Memorial Chapel, Mount Marty College, Yankton, South Dakota
Church of the Epiphany (Catholic), Chicago, Illinois
St. Francis de Sales Church, Beckley, West Virginia
St. Teresa Rectory, Cincinnati, Ohio
St. Stephen Church, (now called Holy Spirit Church), Newport, Kentucky
St. Andrew School, Indianapolis, Indiana
St. Marty Hospital X-ray Department, Yankton, South Dakota
St. Peter Church, Chillicothe, Ohio
St. Dominic Church, Cincinnati, Ohio
St. James Church and School, Eau Claire, Wisconsin
St. Martin School, Cheviot, Ohio
Christ the King School and Convent, Lexington, Kentucky
St. Lawrence Church alterations and redecoration, Cincinnati, Ohio
St. Bernard Abbey Library, St. Bernard, Alabama
Guardian Angel School addition, Cincinnati, Ohio
St. Mary School, Muncie, Indiana
1951–1952
St. Theresa School Auditorium and Convent, Southgate, Kentucky
St. Mary Church and Rectory, Decatur, Indiana
Bishop's Residence and Chancery, Crookston, Minnesota
Sacred Heart Cathedral and Rectory, Salina, Kansas
Christ the King School addition, Lexington, Kentucky
St. Paul Lutheran Church, Cincinnati, Ohio
Holy Trinity Church, West Union, Ohio
Sacred Heart Church, Muenster, Texas
Christ the King Chapel, St. Ambrose University, Davenport, Iowa 
St. Dominic Monastery, La Crosse, Wisconsin
Church of the Nativity Convent, Cincinnati, Ohio
St. Joseph Indian Mission Chapel and School, South Dakota
St. Ursula Academy Auditorium and addition, Cincinnati, Ohio
1953–1955
Blessed Sacrament Church, Rectory and Convent Sioux City, Iowa
St. Anthony Church and Rectory, Dayton, Ohio
St. Peter in Chains Cathedral restoration, Cincinnati, Ohio
Holy Angels High School, Sidney, Ohio
St. Mary of the Assumption Church Decatur, Indiana
Christ the King Church, Dallas, Texas
St. James Church, Eau Claire, Wisconsin
St. Agnes Church, Cincinnati, Ohio
All Saints School, Montgomery, Ohio
Church of the Good Shepherd Rectory, Frankfort, Kentucky
St. James School addition, Cincinnati, Ohio
St. Clare Church, Cincinnati, Ohio
Milford Novitiate Chapel, Milford, Ohio
Our Lord Christ the King Church, Cincinnati, Ohio
St. Meinrad Guest House, St. Meinrad, Indiana
1956–1958
Good Shepherd School addition, Frankfort, Kentucky
St. Paul Church, Vicksburg, Mississippi
Villa Madonna Academy, Covington, Kentucky
St. Gregory Church and Rectory, Phoenix, Arizona
Notre Dame Convent addition, Covington, Kentucky
St. Bernard Abbey Church, St. Bernard, Alabama
All Saints School addition, Montgomery, Ohio
Fairview Heights Elementary School, Cincinnati, Ohio
Provident Bank Building, Cincinnati, Ohio
St. Cecilia School and Auditorium, Houston, Texas
1959–1961
Christ the King School addition, Lexington, Kentucky
St. Raphael Church, Pittsburgh, Pennsylvania
Immaculate Conception Church and Rectory, Albuquerque, New Mexico
Zion Evangelical Church addition, Norwood, Ohio
St. Gertrude School addition, Cincinnati, Ohio
Grace Church and Sunday School, Grand Rapids, Michigan
St. Joseph the Workman Cathedral, La Crosse, Wisconsin
St. Gertrude Church, Cincinnati, Ohio
St. Mary Church alterations, Cincinnati, Ohio
St. Vincent Ferrer School, Cincinnati, Ohio
St. Gertrude Priory, Cincinnati, Ohio
All Saints Church addition, Montgomery, Ohio
Saints Faith, Hope and Charity Church, Winnetka, Illinois
St. Joseph Church, Plymouth, Ohio
1962–1964
St. Joseph Church and Rectory, Cold Springs, Kentucky
Notre Dame Academy, Covington, Kentucky
St. Anne Church, Rectory and Convent, Castle Shannon, Pennsylvania
Lutheran Church of the Good Shepherd addition, Cincinnati, Ohio
1965–1967
St. Michael Church (with Charles Hightower), Houston, Texas
St. Cecelia Rectory addition, Cincinnati, Ohio
Corbett Music Center, University of Cincinnati, Cincinnati, Ohio
Mother of Mercy Academy, Cincinnati, Ohio
Quebec Heights Elementary School, Cincinnati, Ohio
Christ the King Church (now cathedral) and Rectory, Lexington, Kentucky
Church of the Nativity, Cincinnati, Ohio
St. James Church, Cincinnati, Ohio
Pedestrian Bridge, University of Cincinnati, Cincinnati, Ohio

Gallery

[]

Publications
 The Cathedral (1956)
 The Lord Was My Client (1972)

References

Other references
 Edward J. Schulte and American Church Architecture of the Twentieth Century, Donald A. Tenoever, master's thesis, University of Cincinnati, 1974

1890 births
1975 deaths
20th-century American architects
Architects of Roman Catholic churches
American ecclesiastical architects